Willem van Veldhuizen  (born January 13, 1954 in Rotterdam, Netherlands) is a Dutch painter, known for his photorealism and hyperrealism paintings of his museum interiors.

Life and work
His work is influenced by classical masters like the 17th century Dutch painter of church interiors Pieter Jansz Saenredam, with whom he shares a preference for sacred rooms, tranquility and colors in harmonizing tones, and by classic-modern masters like Mark Rothko.
 
The composition of his paintings are composed according to an established pattern: "The upper, narrow part of the canvas shows the back wall or a glass wall through which a garden is visible. A large floor area holds a prominent place. The reality of the building or the world outside is reflected in the floors" The floor area is builds up the according to a special technique: "After the undercoat has been applied and the shadows have been put in, he 'splats' the paint against the canvas: color over color, layer on top of layer - making subtle distinctions in light and dark against the back wall".

In the paintings of his museum interiors, Van Veldhuizen quotes his favorites in art, among others Michelangelo, Picasso, Man Ray, Barnett Newman, Gerrit Rietveld and Le Corbusier.

Publications
 Willem van Veldhuizen (1991). Willem van Veldhuizen: tekeningen & schilderijen. 
 Willem van Veldhuizen & Loek Brons (2001). Willem van Veldhuizen, 1991-2001: tien jaar bij drs. Loek Brons., Van Spijk Art Projects, 2001. 
 Willem van Veldhuizen (2002). Les filles d'atelier. W. Pijbes (inl.) Kunsthal, 2002.

References

External links
 Homepage
 Exhibition in the Kunsthal in 2002

1954 births
Living people
Dutch painters
Dutch male painters
Painters from Rotterdam
Willem de Kooning Academy alumni